Largo Treze is a metro station on Line 5 (Lilac) of the São Paulo Metro in the Santo Amaro district of São Paulo, Brazil.
It was the terminus station of the line until February 12, 2014, when the Adolfo Pinheiro was inaugurated.

References

São Paulo Metro stations
Railway stations opened in 2002
Railway stations located underground in Brazil